The knockout stage of 2011-12 Liga Indonesia Premier Division took place between July 5, 2012 and July 8, 2012 with the final at the Manahan Stadium in Surakarta, Central Java. To determine which teams who were to be promoted to the Indonesia Super League After the completion of the group stage on 1 July 2012, four teams qualified for the semi-finals (two from each group), which were played from 5 July 2012. The Champions, Runner-Up, and the 3rd Place finishers directly qualified to the 2012-13 Indonesia Super League with the 4th-place finisher qualified via Play-off with the 15th-place finisher of the 2011-12 Indonesia Super League.

Qualified teams

Bracket

Semi-finals

Persepam  vs Barito Putera

PSIM vs Persita

Third-placed

Final

Promotion/relegation play-off 

NB:
(O) = Play-off winner; (P) = Promoted to 2012–13 Indonesia Super League; (R) = Relegated to 2012–13 Liga Indonesia Premier Division.

References

Knockout stage